Al Bataeh Club is a football club from Al Bataeh, Sharjah, United Arab Emirates. The team joined the UAE football league in 2019–20 season.

Current squad
As of UAE Division One:

Pro-League Record

Notes 2019–20 UAE football season was cancelled due to the COVID-19 pandemic in the United Arab Emirates.

Key
 Pos. = Position
 Tms. = Number of teams
 Lvl. = League

References

Bataeh
Sport in the Emirate of Sharjah